The Dari Ovoo (Mongolian: Дарь овоо), also known as Altan Ovoo (Mongolian: Алтан овоо, lit. "golden+ovoo"), is an extinct volcano in the Dariganga district, Sukhbaatar Province in eastern Mongolia. The mountain is a regional sacred mountain in Mongolia.

References 

Mountains of Mongolia
Volcanoes of Mongolia